In the United Kingdom, an anaesthesia associate is a healthcare worker who provides anaesthesia under the medical direction and supervision of a consultant anaesthetist (who is a medical doctor). Anaesthesia associates are not doctors themselves, but rather enter the role by completing a 27-month full-time training programme which leads to the award of a postgraduate diploma, or alternatively a 24-month training programme via University College London leading to a Masters degree. It is classed as a medical associate profession. To be eligible, a candidate must have a previous degree in a biomedical or science subject, or recognised previous healthcare experience in another role.

The role was introduced into the UK National Health Service in 2004, under the title of physicians' assistant (anaesthesia), abbreviated to PA(A). The current name for the role was introduced in July 2019. Despite the similarity of the name, the role was always distinct from physician assistant, which refers to a non-doctor practitioner who works in areas of medicine other than anaesthesia. At present, the role is not subject to statutory regulation, meaning it is not mandatory for anaesthesia associates to be registered with any professional body. In July 2019, the UK government announced its intention to request that the General Medical Council would in future regulate anaesthesia associates as a distinct profession.

References

Anesthesia
Health care occupations